Ken Akashi (born 6 November 1976 in Tokyo) is a Japanese race walker.

Achievements

References

1976 births
Living people
Japanese male racewalkers
Athletes from Tokyo
20th-century Japanese people
21st-century Japanese people